Jonathan Sloane (November 1785April 25, 1854) was a U.S. Representative from Ohio.

Born in Pelham, Massachusetts in November 1785, Sloane completed preparatory studies and was graduated from Williams College, Williamstown, Massachusetts, in 1812.
He studied law, was admitted to the bar in 1816, and commenced practice in Ravenna, Ohio.
He was also general agent of the Tappan family for the sale of lands.
He served as prosecuting attorney of Portage County in 1819.
He served in the Ohio House of Representatives from 1820 to 1822, and in the Ohio Senate in 1826 and 1827.

Sloane was elected as an Anti-Masonic candidate to the Twenty-third and the Twenty-fourth Congresses (March 4, 1833 – March 3, 1837).
He declined to be a candidate for renomination in 1836.
He retired from business activities on account of ill health. He died in Ravenna, Ohio, April 25, 1854. He was interred in Evergreen Cemetery.

References

1785 births
1854 deaths
People from Pelham, Massachusetts
Anti-Masonic Party members of the United States House of Representatives from Ohio
Anti-Masonic Party politicians from Ohio
Members of the Ohio House of Representatives
People from Ravenna, Ohio
Williams College alumni
19th-century American politicians
Members of the United States House of Representatives from Ohio